Rabenstein an der Pielach is a municipality in the district of Sankt Pölten-Land in Lower Austria, Austria.

Geography
Rabenstein an der Pielach lies in the middle of the Pielach valley in the Mostviertel in Lower Austria. About 45.51 percent of the municipality is forested.

History 
Franz König, Cardinal of the Catholic Church, was born in the village Warth in Rabenstein an der Pielach.

References

 
Cities and towns in St. Pölten-Land District